Avery W. Severance (February 23, 1819 – February 15, 1874) was an American farmer and politician from New York.

Life
He was born on February 23, 1819, in New Haven, Oswego County, New York, the son of Seth Severance (1787–1856) and Abigail S. (Wells) Severance (c.1793–1821). In 1844, he married Julia N. Marvin (1823–1910), and they had several children. He engaged in farming, and was for some time President of the Agricultural Society of Oswego County. He became known as an intelligent mediator of local conflicts, and was appointed as guardian of dozens of orphaned children.

Severance was a Justice of the Peace in 1841; Supervisor of the Town of New Haven in 1855 and 1856, and from 1860 to 1871; and a member of the New York State Assembly (Oswego Co., 3rd D.) in 1865.

He died on February 15, 1874, in New Haven, New York.

References

1819 births
1874 deaths
People from Oswego County, New York
Republican Party members of the New York State Assembly
Town supervisors in New York (state)
19th-century American politicians